James Ackers (1811 – 27 September 1868) was a British Conservative politician.

Ackers was elected Conservative Member of Parliament for Ludlow at the 1841 general election and held the seat until 1847 when he did not seek re-election.

References

External links
 

UK MPs 1841–1847
Conservative Party (UK) MPs for English constituencies
1811 births
1868 deaths